"Cold Iron" is a poem written by Rudyard Kipling published as the introduction to Rewards and Fairies in 1910. Not to be confused with Cold Iron (The Tale).

In 1983, Leslie Fish set the poem to music and recorded it as the title track on her fifth cassette-tape album. In 1996, the song was nominated for a Pegasus Award for "Best Spiritual Song" by a ballot of science fiction and fantasy fans, conducted by the committee of the annual  Ohio Valley Filk Fest (OVFF), a filk music convention.

Summary
Cold Iron begins with Baron realizing that war (cold iron) is the gift/ or metal of man. The second stanza implies that the Baron believes force is how one gets what they want. The third stanza implies the foolishness of the Baron. Skip to stanza seven, and the reader sees that the King throughout the poem has been Christ. The eighth stanza talks about Christianity and the forgiveness Christ gives to his followers.

Interpretation
Peter Bellamy sang it on his first album of songs set to Kipling's poems: Oak, Ash, & Thorn. He stated that the text of the song isn't derived from the tale of Cold Iron but they share a common theme of the iron's influence over men and the People of the Hills. 
     
William H. Stoddard observed that "Cold Iron" means ordinary iron that the Roman Legion used to crucify criminals, he also commented how the iron was interpreted differently as a magical substance.

References

Poetry by Rudyard Kipling
1910 poems